Fiorina may refer to:

People with the surname
 Alejandro Fiorina (born 1988), an Argentine footballer
 Betty Fiorina (c. 1920–2010), an American politician
 Carly Fiorina (born 1954), business executive and 2016 presidential candidate
 Morris P. Fiorina (born 1946), political scientist and author

Other uses
 Fiorina (San Marino), a village in San Marino
 Fiorina 161, a fictional planet and the setting of Alien 3
 Fiorina la vacca (Fiorina the Cow), a 1972 film directed by Vittorio De Sisti

See also
 Fiorino (disambiguation)
 Fiorini (disambiguation)